Two ships of the United States Navy has been named USS Tulsa, after Tulsa, Oklahoma. A third ship of this name was planned but never built.

 , a gunboat that served during World War II receiving two battle stars. Commissioned 3 December 1923 and renamed  18 December 1944. The ship was decommissioned 6 March 1946.
 USS Tulsa (CA-129), assigned 27 November 1944 to be an  built at Quincy, Massachusetts, by the Bethlehem Steel Company's Fore River Plant. However, on 12 August 1945, before the ship's keel had been laid, the contract for her construction was cancelled.
Commissioned on 16 February 2019, the ship is now assigned to Littoral Combat Ship Squadron One.

References

 

United States Navy ship names